Matija Antun Reljković Gymnasium Vinkovci is a coeducational gymnasium type secondary school in Vinkovci in eastern Croatia. Gymnasium carries out the educational programs of general, science and language gymnasium specialisations. Classes are taught in Croatian. The institution is one of the most renowned high schools in eastern Croatia with numerous notable alumni and professors linked to the institutional history.

History
The school was established as Society of Jesus gymnasium in 1766 under permission of Empress Maria Theresa. At that time, the school was located in Petrovaradin. After the abolition of Austrian Society of Jesus in 1773. year, the school moved under state and military administration. In 1779 the school moved to Vinkovci. In 1850 the high school introduced Croatian as a separate subject called Illyrian language. Two years later, a German exchange Latin as a language of instruction.

The Gymnasium is named after Matija Antun Reljković since 1966.

Notable students
 Kosta Trifković
 Antun Branko Šimić

References

External links
 

Gymnasiums in Croatia
Schools in Vukovar-Srijem County
Vinkovci
Educational institutions established in 1766
Buildings and structures in Vukovar-Syrmia County